Hayes Township may refer to:

Iowa

 Hayes Township, Buena Vista County, Iowa
 Hayes Township, Crawford County, Iowa
 Hayes Township, Ida County, Iowa

Kansas

 Hayes Township, Clay County, Kansas
 Hayes Township, Dickinson County, Kansas
 Hayes Township, Franklin County, Kansas
 Hayes Township, McPherson County, Kansas
 Hayes Township, Mitchell County, Kansas, in Mitchell County, Kansas
 Hayes Township, Reno County, Kansas, in Reno County, Kansas
 Hayes Township, Stafford County, Kansas, in Stafford County, Kansas

Michigan

 Hayes Township, Charlevoix County, Michigan
 Hayes Township, Clare County, Michigan
 Hayes Township, Otsego County, Michigan

Minnesota

 Hayes Township, Swift County, Minnesota

Nebraska

 Hayes Township, Custer County, Nebraska
 Hayes Township, Kearney County, Nebraska

Township name disambiguation pages